Emlyn is one of the seven districts of the Kingdom of Dyfed. It is a Welsh name and may refer to:

People with the given name 

 Emlyn Aubrey (born 1964), American golfer
 Emlyn Crowther (born 1949 ) New Zealand drummer
 Emlyn Garner Evans (1910–1963), British barrister
 Emlyn Gwynne (1898–1962), Welsh rugby player
 Emlyn Hooson, Baron Hooson (1925–2012) Welsh politician
 Emlyn Hughes (1947–2004), English footballer
 Emlyn Jenkins (1910–1993), Welsh rugby player
 Emlyn John (1907–1962), Welsh footballer
 Emlyn Jones (born 1907) Welsh footballer
 Emlyn Morinelli McFarland, American actress
 Emlyn Rhoderick (1920–2007), Welsh physicist 
 Emlyn Walters (1918–2001), Welsh rugby player
 Emlyn Watkins (1904–1978), Welsh rugby player
 Emlyn A. G. Watkins (1926–2010), Welsh police officer
 Emlyn Williams (1905–1987), Welsh writer
 Emlyn Williams (footballer, born 1903), Welsh football player for Hull City
 Emlyn Williams (footballer, born 1912), Welsh football player for Barnsley and Preston North End
 Emlyn Williams (trade unionist), Welsh trade union leader
 Emlyn Mulligan, Irish Gaelic footballer

People with the surname 

 Dafydd Emlyn, 17th-century Welsh poet 
 Endaf Emlyn (born 1944), Welsh musician
 Henry Emlyn (1729–1815), English architect
 John Emlyn-Jones (1889–1952) was Welsh politician 
 Judith Emlyn Johnson (born 1936), American poet
 Sollom Emlyn (1697–1754), Irish legal writer
 Thomas Emlyn (1663–1741), English nonconformist

In fiction 

 Emlyn the Gremlyn, Children's BBC puppet-presenter

Places 

 Newcastle Emlyn, town in West Wales
 Newcastle Emlyn Castle, ruined castle
 Emlyn, Kentucky, census-designated place in Whitley County, Kentucky

Other 

 Viscount Emlyn, peerage title
 Emlyn Beagles, Welsh dog breed
 Emlyn Hughes International Soccer, computer game
 St Emlyn's, virtual hospital 
 Ysgol Gyfun Emlyn, school in Newcastle Emlyn
 Newcastle Emlyn RFC
 Emlyn Hughes House

See also